Haleyville is a city in Winston and Marion counties in the U.S. state of Alabama. It incorporated on February 28, 1889. Most of the city is located in Winston County, with a small portion of the western limits entering Marion County. Haleyville was originally named "Davis Cross Roads", having been established at the crossroads of Byler Road and the Illinois Central Railroad. At the 2020 census the population was 4,361, up from 4,173 at the 2010 census.

History

The first Guthrie's restaurant was opened by Hal Guthrie in Haleyville in 1965.

On February 16, 1968, the first 9-1-1 emergency telephone system in the nation went into service in Haleyville.

On June 1, 2010, Haleyville citizens voted to become the first city in Winston County since Prohibition to allow the sale of alcohol.

The city has one site listed on the National Register of Historic Places, the former Feldman's Department Store, and is the closest city to another site, Archeological Site No. 1WI50.

Geography
Haleyville is located in northwestern Winston County and northeastern Marion County at  (34.230131, -87.618978).

The city sits on the Tennessee Valley Divide, with the north half of the town draining into tributaries of the Tennessee River, the southwest quarter draining to tributaries of the Tombigbee River, and the southeast quarter draining to tributaries of the Black Warrior River. 

Northwest Alabama is in the foothills of the southwest end of the Appalachian Mountains, so Haleyville is hilly. The soil there, made of sand and clay combined, is very sensitive to water, so there are many creeks and little valleys. This is especially noticeable at the city lake, which is surrounded by hills.

Climate

Demographics

2000 census
At the 2000 census there were 4,182 people, 1,815 households, and 1,148 families living in the city. The racial makeup of the city was 94.81% White, 1.48% Black or African American, 0.17% Native American, 0.12% Asian, 2.68% from other races, and 0.74% from two or more races. 3.11% of the population were Latino of any race.
Of the 1,815 households 26.6% had children under the age of 52 living with them, 49.3% were married couples living together, 11.2% had a female householder with no husband present, and 36.7% were non-families. 34.0% of households were one person and 17.5% were one person aged 65 or older. The average household size was 2.25 and the average family size was 2.87.

The age distribution was 22.5% under the age of 18, 7.4% from 18 to 24, 24.2% from 25 to 44, 25.3% from 45 to 64, and 20.6% 65 or older. The median age was 42 years. For every 100 females, there were 86.3 males. For every 100 females age 18 and over, there were 81.3 males.

The median household income was $24,907 and the median family income  was $33,875. Males had a median income of $27,028 versus $18,312 for females. The per capita income for the city was $16,139. About 18.9% of families and 23.0% of the population were below the poverty line, including 35.9% of those under age 18 and 20.9% of those age 65 or over.

2010 census
At the 2010 census there were 4,173 people, 1,783 households, and 1,114 families living in the city. The racial makeup of the city was 92.1% White, 0.7% Black or African American, 1.0% Native American, 0.5% Asian, 3.4% from other races, and 2.0% from two or more races. 6.0% of the population were Latino of any race.
Of the 1,783 households 26.9% had children under the age of 52 living with them, 44.0% were married couples living together, 14.2% had a female householder with no husband present, and 37.5% were non-families. 33.9% of households were one person and 16.4% were one person aged 65 or older. The average household size was 2.28 and the average family size was 2.91.

The age distribution was 23.0% under the age of 18, 7.4% from 18 to 24, 23.8% from 25 to 44, 25.1% from 45 to 64, and 20.8% 65 or older. The median age was 41.8 years. For every 100 females, there were 84.7 males. For every 100 females age 18 and over, there were 92.3 males.

The median household income was $23,191 and the median family income  was $35,463. Males had a median income of $35,292 versus $20,789 for females. The per capita income for the city was $15,636. About 29.8% of families and 37.5% of the population were below the poverty line, including 61.6% of those under age 18 and 21.4% of those age 65 or over.

2020 census

As of the 2020 United States census, there were 4,361 people, 1,536 households, and 989 families residing in the city.

Education
The Haleyville City School System operates three places of public education: Haleyville Elementary School, Haleyville Middle School, and Haleyville High School.  Also within the system lies the Haleyville Center of Technology, a career and vocational training center.

Haleyville High School's mascot is the lion, and the school colors are red and white.

The system is the home of the Haleyville High School Band, which has won several national championships. Its last notable victory came under the direction of Ken Williams (director from 1990 to 2007), during a national competition held 2003 at the Morton H. Meyerson Symphony Center, in Dallas, TX.  The band received all superior ratings and was crowned Grand Champion of the competition.

In October 2014, Haleyville High School was awarded the Safe School Initiative Award of Excellence. In April 2017 Haleyville Elementary School received the Charlotte F. Lockhart Award for Excellence in Literacy Education.

Athletics
The 2008 Roaring Lions finished third in the state in cross country. The 2009 Roaring Lions boys team also finished third in the state in cross country. The Haleyville Boys Golf team qualified for the state championship tournament in 2005 (seventh place), 2006 (sixth place), 2007 (fourth place), 2008 (sixth place), 2010 (sixth place), 2011 (fourth place), 2015 (fourth place), and 2017 (third place). The Haleyville Lions Baseball team reached the state finals two years in a row coming in second (2008) and State Champions (2009). The Lady Lions Softball team won a Championship in their second year and reached the state tournament (2012). The Lady Lions also won another state championship, making it two in a row in 2013.

City council
The city's elected representatives are as follows.
Mayor - Ken Sunseri (2008–present)
Place 1 - Julie "Boo" Brooks (2020–present)
Place 2 - Drew Thrasher (2008–present)
Place 3 - Bud Wilson (2008–present)
Place 4 - Jonathan Bennett (2008–present)
Place 5 - Brian Berry (2020–present)

Notable people
Robert Aderholt, congressman from Alabama's 4th congressional district
Pat Buttram, actor, retired to Haleyville
Frank Minis Johnson Jr., federal judge
Rebekah Mason, former aide and current romantic partner to Governor Robert Bentley
Ben Smith, former professional football player

References

External links

Haleyville News
Haleyville Chamber of Commerce
Northwest Alabamian Newspaper
Haleyville Fire/Rescue
Winston County Historical Online Database

Cities in Alabama
Cities in Winston County, Alabama
Cities in Marion County, Alabama